Patricia Jean Boyle ( Ehrhardt, later Pernick; March 31, 1937 – January 13, 2014) was a United States district judge of the United States District Court for the Eastern District of Michigan.

Education and career
Born in Detroit, Michigan as Patricia Jean Ehrhardt, Boyle received a Bachelor of Arts degree from Wayne State University and a Juris Doctor from Wayne State University Law School in 1963. She was a law clerk to Kenneth Davies, a Detroit attorney from 1963 to 1964, and to Judge Thaddeus M. Machrowicz of the United States District Court for the Eastern District of Michigan from 1964 to 1965. She was an Assistant United States Attorney for the Eastern District of Michigan in Detroit from 1965 to 1970. She was an assistant prosecuting attorney of Wayne County, Michigan from 1970 to 1976. She was a judge of the Recorder's Court of the City of Detroit from 1976 to 1978.

Federal judicial service

On July 25, 1978, Boyle was nominated by President Jimmy Carter to a seat on the United States District Court for the Eastern District of Michigan vacated by Judge Damon Keith. She was confirmed by the United States Senate on September 22, 1978, and received her commission the following day. She resigned on April 20, 1983, to be appointed as an associate justice of the Michigan Supreme Court. She was elected to the Court in 1986, and re-elected to an eight-year term beginning in 1990. Her service on the Michigan Supreme Court ended in 1998.

Death

Boyle died on January 13, 2014, of respiratory failure at the age of 76, in Fort Myers, Florida.

References

External links
 
 Michigan Supreme Court Historical Society page on Patricia Boyle

1937 births
2014 deaths
Assistant United States Attorneys
Deaths from respiratory failure
Judges of the United States District Court for the Eastern District of Michigan
Michigan state court judges
Justices of the Michigan Supreme Court
Lawyers from Detroit
Wayne State University alumni
Wayne State University Law School alumni
United States district court judges appointed by Jimmy Carter
20th-century American judges
20th-century American women judges